HVY may refer to:
 HeavyLift Cargo Airlines, a defunct Australian airline
 Helenium virus Y

See also 
 Heavy (disambiguation)